N-Ethylmaleimide (NEM) is an organic compound that is derived from maleic acid.  It contains the amide functional group, but more importantly it is an alkene that is reactive toward thiols and is commonly used to modify cysteine residues in proteins and peptides.

Organic chemistry
NEM is a Michael Acceptor in Michael Reaction, which means that it adds nucleophiles such as thiols.  The resulting thioether features a strong C-S bond and the reaction is virtually irreversible.  Reaction with thiols occur in the pH range 6.5–7.5, NEM may react with amines or undergo hydrolysis at a more alkaline pH.  NEM has been widely used to probe the functional role of thiol groups in enzymology. NEM is an irreversible inhibitor of all cysteine peptidases, with alkylation occurring at the active site thiol group (see schematic).

Case studies
NEM blocks vesicular transport. In lysis buffers, 20 to 25 mM of NEM is used to inhibit de-sumoylation of proteins for Western Blot analysis. NEM has also been used as an inhibitor of deubiquitinases.

N-Ethylmaleimide was used by Arthur Kornberg and colleagues to knock out DNA polymerase III in order to compare its activity to that of DNA polymerase I (pol III and I, respectively). Kornberg had been awarded the Nobel Prize for discovering pol I, then believed to be the mechanism of bacterial DNA replication, although in this experiment he showed that pol III was the actual replicative machinery.

NEM activates ouabain-insensitive Cl-dependent K efflux in low K sheep and goat red blood cells. This discovery contributed to the molecular identification of K-Cl cotransport (KCC) in human embryonic cells transfected by KCC1 isoform cDNA, 16 years later. Since then, NEM has been widely used as a diagnostic tool to uncover or manipulate the membrane presence of K-Cl cotransport in cells of many species in the animal kingdom. Despite repeated unsuccessful attempts to identify chemically the target thiol group, at physiological pH, NEM may form adducts with thiols within protein kinases that phosphorylate KCC at specific serine and threonine residues primarily within the C-terminal domain of the transporter. The ensuing dephosphorylation of KCC by protein phosphatases leads to activation of KCC.

References

External links
 The MEROPS online database for peptidases and their inhibitors: NEM
 The bifunctional analogues such as p-NN'-phenylenebismaleimide can be used as cross-linking reagent for cystine residues.  see Lutter, L. C., Zeichhardt, H., Kurland, C. G. & Stoffier,G. (1972) Mol. Gen. Genet. 119, 357-366.

Maleimides
Biochemistry
Biochemistry methods
Reagents
Reagents for biochemistry
Enzyme inhibitors
Protease inhibitors